Hersiliidae is a tropical and subtropical family of spiders first described by Tamerlan Thorell in 1869, which are commonly known as tree trunk spiders. They have two prominent spinnerets that are almost as long as their abdomen, earning them another nickname, the "two-tailed spiders". Rather than using a web that captures prey directly, they lay a light coating of threads over an area of tree bark and wait for an insect to stray onto the patch. When this happens, they encircle their spinnerets around their prey while casting silk on it. When the insect is immobilized, they can bite it through the shroud.

Diversity
Hersiliidae is an entelegyne family (characterized primarily by the nature of the female genital system), and together with the family Oecobiidae traditionally formed the superfamily Oecobioidea. The family consists of about 206 species divided into sixteen genera. It has a global distribution in tropical and subtropical regions, with only a few species being found north of the 40°N parallel. All members are ecribellate (lack the cribella or perforated plates which produce multiple, exceptionally fine strands of silk) and are recognizable by the pair of exceptionally long spinnerets set at the tip of the abdomen. They have eight eyes, set in two curved rows. They are small to medium-sized spiders and are active day and night. They are very well camouflaged when stationary on the trunk of a tree and aligned with the bark markings.

Genera

, the World Spider Catalog accepts the following genera:

Bastanius Mirshamsi, Zamani & Marusik, 2016 — Iran
Deltshevia Marusik & Fet, 2009 — Turkmenistan, Kazakhstan, Uzbekistan
Duninia Marusik & Fet, 2009 — Turkmenistan, Iran
Hersilia Audouin, 1826 — Africa, Asia, Oceania
Hersiliola Thorell, 1870 — Asia, Africa, Spain
Iviraiva Rheims & Brescovit, 2004 — South America
Murricia Simon, 1882 — Asia, Africa
Neotama Baehr & Baehr, 1993 — South Africa, South America, North America, El Salvador, Asia
Ovtsharenkoia Marusik & Fet, 2009 — Central Asia
Prima Foord, 2008 — Madagascar
Promurricia Baehr & Baehr, 1993 — Sri Lanka
Tama Simon, 1882 — Spain, Portugal, Algeria
Tamopsis Baehr & Baehr, 1987 — Australia, Indonesia, Papua New Guinea
Tyrotama Foord & Dippenaar-Schoeman, 2005 — Africa
Yabisi Rheims & Brescovit, 2004 — Dominican Republic, United States, Cuba
Ypypuera Rheims & Brescovit, 2004 — South America

Extinct genera 

 †Burmesiola Wunderlich 2011 Burmese amber, Myanmar, Cenomanian
 †Fictotama Petrunkevitch 1963 Dominican amber, Miocene
 †Gerdia Menge 1869 Baltic amber, Eocene
 †Gerdiopsis Wunderlich 2004 Baltic amber, Eocene
 †Gerdiorum Wunderlich 2004 Baltic amber, Eocene

Gallery

See also
 List of Hersiliidae species

References

External links

 Order Araneae - Spiders at BugGuide (including images)
 Hersilia sp. Hersiliidae—Image